John Thomas Dean (13 February 1881–unknown) was an English footballer who played in the Football League for Notts County and Wolverhampton Wanderers.

References

1881 births
English footballers
Association football forwards
English Football League players
Wolverhampton Wanderers F.C. players
Telford United F.C. players
Notts County F.C. players
Year of death missing